Below is a list of the 78 bairros (neighborhoods) and four territories of Porto Alegre, Brazil.

A
 Aberta dos Morros
 Agronomia
 Anchieta
 Arquipélago
 Auxiliadora
 Azenha

B
 Bela Vista
 Belém Novo
 Belém Velho
 Boa Vista
 Bom Fim
 Bom Jesus

C
 Camaquã
 Cascata
 Cavalhada
 Cel. Aparício Borges
 Centro Histórico
 Chácara das Pedras
 Cidade Baixa
 Cristal
 Cristo Redentor

E
 Espírito Santo

F
 Farrapos
 Farroupilha
 Floresta

G
 Glória
 Guarujá

H
 Higienópolis
 Hípica
 Humaitá

I
 Independência
 Ipanema

J
 Jardim Botânico
 Jardim Carvalho
 Jardim do Salso
 Jardim Isabel
 Jardim Floresta
 Jardim Itu-Sabará
 Jardim Lindoia
 Jardim São Pedro

L
 Lami
 Lomba do Pinheiro

M
 Marcílio Dias
 Mário Quintana
 Medianeira
 Menino Deus
 Moinhos de Vento
 Mont' Serrat

N
 Navegantes
 Nonoai

P
 Partenon
 Passo d'Areia
 Pedra Redonda
 Petrópolis
 Ponta Grossa
 Praia de Belas

R
 Restinga
 Rio Branco
 Rubem Berta

S
 Santa Cecília
 Santa Maria Goretti
 Santa Tereza
 Santana
 Santo Antônio
 São Geraldo
 São João
 São José
 São Sebastião
 Sarandi
 Serraria

T
 Teresópolis
 Três Figueiras
 Tristeza

V
 Vila Assunção
 Vila Conceição
 Vila Ipiranga
 Vila Jardim
 Vila João Pessoa
 Vila Nova

 
Porto Alegre
Neighborhoods of Porto Alegre